Alamut, is a region in north of Qazvin province, Iran.

Alamut may also refer to:
Alamut Castle, a mountain fortress in Alamut region
Alamut state, or the Nizari Ismaili state, founded by Hassan-i Sabbah
Alamut series, a 1991 series of novels by Judith Tarr about the Alamut fortress
Alamut (Bartol novel), a 1938 novel by Vladimir Bartol about the Hashshashin and named after the Alamut fortress
Alamut River, Iran
Alamut, Bozdoğan, a village in the district of Bozdoğan, Aydın Province, Turkey
Alamut, a 1918 short story originally published in Adventure magazine and part of the Khlit the Cossack series by Harold Lamb